Hallvard Bakke (born 4 February 1943 in Flesberg) is a Norwegian politician for the Labour Party. He was Minister of Trade and Shipping 1976–1979, and Minister of Culture 1986–1989. From 2006 to 2010, he was the chairman of the Norwegian Broadcasting Corporation. He holds a degree from the Norwegian School of Economics.

References

1943 births
Living people
People from Flesberg
Labour Party (Norway) politicians
Ministers of Culture of Norway
Ministers of Trade and Shipping of Norway
Members of the Storting
Chairs of NRK
20th-century Norwegian politicians